Marie Étienne Pierre Paul Aimé Buffet, known as Étienne Buffet (5 June 1866 – 3 December 1948), was a French painter.

Biography

He was born in Paris, the son of Louis Aimé Buffet (1821–1900), who was Inspector General of Bridges and Highways and Marie Anne Philippine Fliche (1840–1921). He was a nephew of the statesman Louis Joseph Buffet. Before attending the Académie Julian he was a pupil of Franck Bail (1858–1924) and later of William Laparra (1873–1920), Paul Albert Laurens, Jean-Pierre Laurens (1875–1932) and Henri Royer.
Étienne Buffet exhibited at the Salon des artistes français from 1903 until 1944. He was appointed "sociétaire" in 1910 and received an "honourable mention" in 1938 for the painting Lecture. He wrote "Essai de théorie intégrale de la peinture, la doctrine" which approached painting from a mathematician's viewpoint. He also served in the Artillery as a lieutenant-colonel.

Buffet died in Paris on 3 December 1948.

Works exhibited
 1903 - Salon des artistes français, Éplucheuse de légumes. Catalogue number 287.
 1905 - Salon des artistes français, Intérieur. Catalogue number  297.
 1906 - Salon des artistes français, Repasseuse.
 1907 - Salon des artistes français, Riveur en bijouterie d'acier.  Catalogue number 269.
 1908 - Exposition d'Angers, Riveur en bijouterie d'acier
 1909 - Salon des artistes français, Bretonne épluchant des pommes de terre".  Catalogue number 291
 1910 - Salon des artistes français, Bretonnes autour d'une lampe. Catalogue number 339.
 1912 - Salon des artistes français, Bretonne lisant une lettre.  Catalogue number 294
 1914 - Salon des artistes français, Dentellière bretonne. Catalogue number 326
 1920 - Salon des artistes français, Bretonne d'Auray. Catalogue number 284
 1922 - Salon des artistes français, Avant la pêche. Catalogue number 291  
 1923 - Salon des artistes français, Le Manuscrit arabe.  Catalogue number 306 and Nonchalance  catalogue 307
 1924 - Salon des artistes français, Bretonne.  Catalogue number 334
 1925 - Salon des artistes français, Au Luxembourg. Catalogue number 174 and "'Sur le mur du Port-Louis" catalogue number 115
 1926 - Salon des artistes français,  La lucarne d'où on voit la mer. Catalogue number 329
 1927 - Salon des artistes français, Pêcheuse du Port-Louis Catalogue number 323 and Après la lecture catalogue number 322
 1928 - Salon des artistes français, La Robe à fleurs. Catalogue number 338
 1928 - 3ème Salon Nautique International au Grand Palais, Pêcheuse du Port-Louis and La côte près de Carqueiranne 1929 - Salon des artistes français, Étude. Catalogue  399 and Portrait de Melle B. Catalogue number 389
 1929 - 4ème Salon Nautique International au Grand Palais, Rade de Toulon, Port de Toulon and La mer au Port-Louis 1930 - Salon des artistes français, La Harpe arabe. Catalogue number 349 and Jeune fille catalogue number 350
 1931 - Salon des artistes français, La Robe verte . Catalogue number 370 and La robe jaune catalogue number 371
 1932 - Salon des artistes français, Tricoteuse. Catalogue number 388
 1934 - Salon des artistes français, Rêverie.  Catalogue number 384 and Le tricot vert catalogue 385
 1935 - Salon des artistes français, Les Soucis.  Catalogue number 347 and Incertitude caltaloue number 348
 1936 - Salon des artistes français, Les Bibelots. Catalogue number 431
 1937 - Salon des artistes français, Rêverie . Catalogue number 217.
 1938 - Salon des artistes français, Lecture.  Catalogue number 274.
 1939 - Salon des artistes français, L'Album. Catalogue number 453
 1942 - Salon des artistes français, Portrait (mon portrait symétrique). Catalogue number 177.
 1944 - Salon des artistes français, Les arènes à Paris.  Catalogue number 838 and Le port Henri-IV catalogue 839.

Gallery

 Honours and distinctions
 1908 - Chevalier de la Légion d'honneur
 1910 - Made  "Sociétaire" of the Société des artistes français
 1918 - Officier de la Légion d'honneur
 1938 - "Honourable Mention" at Salon des artistes français.

 References 

 Dictionnaire biographique des artistes contemporains, 1910-1930, tome I, par Edouard-Joseph. Éditeur : Art et Édition, 1931.
 Bénézit, Dictionnaire des peintres, sculpteurs, dessinateurs et graveurs. Éditeur : Gründ, 1999.
 Catalogues des Salons de la Société des artistes français.
 En relisant leurs lettres - souvenirs d'enfance (1909-1919)'', d'Henri-François Buffet. Éditions Bahon-Rault, Rennes, 1964

1866 births
1948 deaths
20th-century French painters
20th-century French male artists
French male painters
Académie Julian alumni
Artists from Paris
Breton art